Eirik Halvorsen (born 15 August 1975) is a Norwegian former ski jumper.

References

1975 births
Living people
Norwegian male ski jumpers
Place of birth missing (living people)